Anna Maria Bernini (born 17 August 1965) is an Italian politician, lawyer and university professor.

Biography
Bernini is a civil and administrative lawyer and associate professor of Compared Public Law at the University of Bologna, where she later taught also Institutions of Public Law, and Law of International and Internal Arbitration and of the alternative procedures. She completed her legal training by participating in several study abroad programs at the University of Michigan, the International Chamber of Commerce (ICC) in Paris, the London Court of International Arbitration (LCIA), Queen Mary College, the Chartered Institute of Arbitrators of London, the Institut du Droit et des Pratiques des Affaires Internationales de la Chambre de Commerce Internationale and the American Arbitration Association (AAA).

Political career
In 2007, Bernini was one of the promoters of the FareFuturo association founded by Gianfranco Fini. She also joined Fini's National Alliance party.

She was elected to the Chamber of Deputies in the 2008 Italian general election with The People of Freedom. In 2010 she was candidate in the Emilia-Romagna regional election, losing against Vasco Errani. On 27 July 2011 she was appointed Minister of European Affairs, following the resignation of Andrea Ronchi.

In the 2013 Italian general election she was elected to the Senate of the Republic. She is later re-elected at the 2018 general election and proposed by the Northern League as a possible candidate for the role of President of the Senate, but she refused, choosing to endorse her party colleague Maria Elisabetta Alberti Casellati.

On 27 March 2018, Bernini is elected group leader of Forza Italia at the Senate.

Political positions
Dissenting from the majority of her party, Bernini is fully favourable to the recognition of same-sex unions in Italy and to the stepchild adoption.

Family
Anna Maria Bernini was the daughter of Giorgio Bernini (1928–2020), who was a lawyer for the United Nations and Forza Italia politician, minister of foreign trade in Berlusconi's first cabinet.

She was married to Luciano Bovicelli, a noted gynecologist, who died in 2011.

Electoral history

References

External links

Politicians from Bologna
National Alliance (Italy) politicians
The People of Freedom politicians
Forza Italia (2013) senators
1965 births
Living people
Women government ministers of Italy
Senators of Legislature XVII of Italy
Senators of Legislature XVIII of Italy
21st-century Italian women politicians
Meloni Cabinet
Women members of the Senate of the Republic (Italy)
21st-century Italian lawyers